Sandy McIntosh  is an American poet, editor, memoirist, software developer, and teacher.

Early life and education
McIntosh was born in Rockville Centre, New York. He attended the Waldorf School until seventh grade, when he was enrolled at the New York Military Academy, from which he graduated, at the suggestion of Fred Trump, a business acquaintance of McIntosh's father. Trump's son Donald was told to help the younger McIntosh navigate school. McIntosh, an underclassman, was enrolled because his father felt he needed to get rid of "all that spiritual nonsense" of his Waldorf School education. McIntosh has written and been interviewed extensively about how the New York Military Academy's culture of hazing formed Donald Trump's behavior.

He received a BA from Southampton College, L.I.U., an MFA from The School of the Arts, Columbia University and a Ph.D. from the Union Institute & University. While at Southampton College, McIntosh participated in informal apprenticeships with the poet David Ignatow and the poet, novelist and translator H.R. Hays.

Career
A poet, memoirist and writer known for wry reconsideration of the familiar, his work has appeared in The New York Times, The Daily Beast, the New York Daily News, The Wall Street Journal, American Book Review, Talisman: A Journal of Contemporary Poetry and Poetics, in print, and in online journals.
His interviews include Phillip Lopate, and Carlos Castaneda scholar and Native American Activist, Jay Courtney Fikes.

McIntosh headed up the H.R. Hays Distinguished Poets series at Guild Hall from 1980 to 2000. His original poetry in a screenplay won the Silver Medal in the Film Festival of the Americas. His collaboration with Denise Duhamel, 237 More Reasons to Have Sex, appears in The Best American Poetry. 
  
In the early 1980s, he edited Wok Talk, a Chinese cooking periodical published by Newsletter Publishing Associates and created an early computer software recipe program, The Best of Wok Talk. Martin Yan wrote frequently for the publication.  McIntosh took a job with The Software Toolworks, which had published his cooking program, where he helped develop the best-selling program Mavis Beacon Teaches Typing!. His work included writing 750 typing lessons and an extensive user's guide.

From 1990-2000 he was Managing Editor of Confrontation, a literary magazine published by Long Island University; and a former literature and creative writing professor at Hofstra University and Long Island University. Since 2001, he has served as Managing Editor and Publisher of Marsh Hawk Press.

Selected bibliography

Memoir
 Plan B: A Poet's Survivors Manual,Chapter One Series, Marsh Hawk Press; May 1, 2022; 
 Lesser Lights: More Tales From a Hampton's Apprenticeship, Marsh Hawk Press; February 1, 2019;  
 A Hole In the Ocean: A Hamptons' Apprenticeship, Marsh Hawk Press, 2016, 
   The year Trump went astray: A former New York Military Academy classmate on the emergence of a self-promoter New York Daily News, August 14, 2020
   How Young Donald Trump Was Slapped and Punched Until He Made His Bed   New York Daily News, August 11, 2017 
    I Showered With Donald Trump at Military School, the Daily Beast, April 13, 2017 
   What Would Donald Trump Do To The White House?, Long Island Press, August 5, 2016 
   For Artists and Poets, the East End Is No Dead End—Just Another ‘Hole in the Ocean’, Long Island Press, February 8, 2016     
   Culture of Hazing: Donald Trump, Me, & The End Of New York Military Academy, Long Island Press, October 5, 2015	
  Fond Memories of a Poet-Mentor, New York Times, November 30, 1997

Poetry
 Obsessional, Poetry for Performance, Marsh Hawk Press, 2017 
 Cemetery Chess, Selected and New Poems Marsh Hawk Press, 2012 
 Ernesta, in the Style of the Flamenco, Marsh Hawk Press, 2010 
 237 More Reasons to Have Sex (written with Denise Duhamel), Otoliths, 2008 
 Forty-Nine Guaranteed Ways To Escape Death, Marsh Hawk Press, 2007 
 The After-Death History of My Mother, Marsh Hawk Press, 2005, 
 Between Earth and Sky. Marsh Hawk Press, 2002, 
 Endless Staircase, Street Press, 1991, 
 Monsters of the Antipodes, Survivors Manual Books, 1980
 Which Way to the Egress?,  Garfield Publishers, 1974
 Earthworks, Southampton College, Long Island University, 1970

Non-fiction
 Firing Back: Power Strategies for Cutting the Best Deal When You're About to Lose Your Job, with Jodie-Beth Galos, John Wiley & Sons, 1997 
 The Poets in the Poets-in-the-Schools Minnesota Center for Social Research, University of Minnesota, 1980
 Confrontation Thirtieth Anniversary Anthology, with Martin Tucker, 1998

Cooking
 From A Chinese Kitchen, The American Cooking Guild, 1985,

Editing and translating
 The Selected Poems of H.R. Hays,  Xlibris Corporation, 2000,  
 Selected Gosho Passages of Nichiren Daishonin (modern English renderings), Nichiren Shoshu: Commemorative Committee, 2015
 Basic Terminology of Nichiren Shoshu (modern English renderings), Nichiren Shoshu: Publication Department, 2009
 On Becoming a Poet: Chapter One series, Marsh Hawk Press, 2022 {ISBN 978-1732614130}]

Awards and prizes
 Selection: The Best American Poetry, 237 More Reasons to Have Sex (collaboration with Denise Duhamel) 
 Silver Medal: Film Festival of the Americas, script award for Ireland: The People and the Caring
 Fellowship: The John Steinbeck Memorial Library Studio, Southampton College

References

External links
Amazon.com: Sandy McIntosh, author's page
 Biography: Contemporary Authors vols. 45-48, Gale (publisher)|Gale Cengage
  Trump, le Parrain de Manhattan, Trump; Trump, the Godfather of Manhattan, directed by Frédéric Mitterrand, France 3, 2018

American male poets
American publishers (people)
Living people
1947 births
20th-century American poets
21st-century American poets
American memoirists
People from Rockville Centre, New York
Columbia University School of the Arts alumni
New York Military Academy alumni
Long Island University alumni
Union Institute & University alumni
20th-century American non-fiction writers
21st-century American non-fiction writers
American male non-fiction writers
20th-century American male writers
21st-century American male writers